Hyphaereon is a genus of beetles in the family Carabidae, containing the following species:

 Hyphaereon baehri N.Ito, 2004 
 Hyphaereon borneensis N.Ito, 1990 
 Hyphaereon celebensis Louwerens, 1951 
 Hyphaereon consors (Bates, 1886) 
 Hyphaereon cordens Darlington, 1968  
 Hyphaereon drescheri (Andrewes, 1937)  
 Hyphaereon hornianus (Schauberger, 1938) 
 Hyphaereon laosensis N.Ito, 2004 
 Hyphaereon lautulus Andrewes, 1929 
 Hyphaereon lawrencei N.Ito, 1997 
 Hyphaereon levis Darlington, 1968 
 Hyphaereon limatus (Andrewes, 1937) 
 Hyphaereon maculatus (Bates, 1886) 
 Hyphaereon masumotoi (N.Ito, 1991) 
 Hyphaereon pallidipes N.Ito, 2004 
 Hyphaereon planipennis N.Ito, 2007 
 Hyphaereon reflexus W.S.Macleay, 1825 
 Hyphaereon shibatai (N.Ito, 1990) 
 Hyphaereon splendens (N.Ito, 1997) 
 Hyphaereon subviridipennis N.Ito, 2004 
 Hyphaereon timidus Darlington, 1968
 Hyphaereon uenoi (N.Ito, 1995) 
 Hyphaereon vittatus (Andrewes, 1926)

References

Harpalinae